This is the discography of American hip hop group Bone Thugs-n-Harmony.

Albums

Studio albums

Compilation albums

Other compilations
2006: Behind the Harmony
2006: Everyday Thugs
2007: Eternal Legends
2009: The Book of Thugs
2009: Uni5 the Prequel: The Untold Story
2011: For Smokers Only

Mixtapes
2009: The Fixtape Vol. 3: Special Delivery
2010: Thuggish II

Extended plays

Singles

As lead artist

As featured artist

Guest appearances

Solo Appearances:

Layzie Bone discography

Krayzie Bone discography

Bizzy Bone discography

Flesh-n-Bone discography

Mo Thugs discography

Wish Bone

Music videos

As lead artist

Notes

References

External links
 
 
 

Hip hop discographies
Discographies of American artists